Željko Goljović (born 3 April 1998) is a Serbian football forward who plays for OFK Beograd.

References

External links
 
 Željko Goljović stats at utakmica.rs

1998 births
Living people
Sportspeople from Kraljevo
Association football forwards
Serbian footballers
FK Radnički 1923 players
Serbian First League players
Serbian SuperLiga players